Bahman is the 11th month of the year in Zoroastrian & Iranian calendars, named after the Zoroastrian concept.

Bahman may also refer to:

Religion 
 Vohu Manah, the Zoroastrian Amesha Spenta (or Good Purpose), also known as Bahman

History 
 Kai Bahman, a mythological king of Iran
 Bahman Jadhuyih, a Sasanian Persian general of the 7th century

Places 
 Bahman District, a district in Yazd Province, Iran 
 Bahman Rural District, a rural district in Fars Province, Iran
 Bahman, Iran, a village in Razavi Khorasan Province, Iran
 Bahman, Yemen, a village in west-central Yemen
 Bahman, Zanjan, a village in Zanjan Province, Iran
 Bahman, Fars, a city in Fars Province, Iran

Sports 
 Bahman F.C., a now-defunct football club of Tehran, Iran

de:Iranischer Kalender#Monatsnamen der iranischen Kalender